L'isola di Arturo (internationally released as Arturo's Island) is a 1962 Italian drama film directed by Damiano Damiani. It is based on the novel with the same name written by Elsa Morante. The film won the Golden Shell at the San Sebastián International Film Festival.

Cast 
Vanni De Maigret: Arturo
Kay Meersman: Nunziata
Reginald Kernan: Wilhelm
Gabriella Giorgelli: Teresa

References

External links

1962 films
Films directed by Damiano Damiani
Italian drama films
1962 drama films
Films based on Italian novels
Films scored by Carlo Rustichelli
Films scored by Nino Rota
Films set in Campania
1960s Italian films
1960s Italian-language films